The Cañoneros Fútbol Club, commonly known as Cañoneros Marina, is a Mexican football club based in Mexico City. The club was founded on 2012, and currently plays in Serie A.

History 
The team was founded on 2012 by an agreement between the mexican Secretariat of the Navy and amateur soccer league, Liga de Fútbol Torneo Central de Reservas. The creation of the team was made with the objective of creating a team to train the talents of the national navy and athletes emerged in the amateur tournament. Between 2012 and 2020 this club was funded in part by the Mexican government by relying on a Federal Secretariat.

From 2012 to 2018, the team participated in Tercera División. The team's greatest success came in the 2017-18 season, when it achieved the second place in the category, after being defeated by Acatlán F.C. in the final series.

The condition as runner-up of the team allowed it to get promotion to Serie B, because its rival did not meet the requirements to participate in this division. Also, the club maintains a reserve team competing in Tercera División.

In the first season in Serie B, the team qualified for the playoffs. In the quarterfinals the team eliminated Mineros de Fresnillo by 6-2 in the aggregate. In semifinals, Marina tied with Atlético Saltillo Soccer, but advanced by his condition of best-seeded team. In the final, the navy defeated Deportivo CAFESSA 3-2 on aggregate, thus winning its first championship in history.

In 2021 the team was renamed Cañoneros F.C. because the Secretariat of the Navy stopped providing financial and institutional support to the club and therefore was no longer representative of the institution.

Players

Current squad

Reserve teams
Cañoneros F.C. (Liga TDP)
Reserve team that plays in the Liga TDP, the fourth level of the Mexican league system.

Honors
 Serie B de México (1): 2018–2019
Tercera División de México (0):
Runner Up: 2017–2018

References

External links 

 Team Info

Football clubs in Mexico City
Segunda División de México
Association football clubs established in 2012
2012 establishments in Mexico